Sally Greer (born 25 March 1955) is an American former professional tennis player.

Biography
Greer, the daughter of Cuban American parents, grew up in Miami, Florida. She played college tennis for the University of Miami in 1972/73, then embarked on a five-year career on the professional tour.

During her time on the tour she featured in the main draw of all four grand slam tournaments, with her best performance a third round appearance at the 1975 Australian Open.

Retiring from tennis at the age of 23, Greer soon after began a career in media, as a sports anchor and reporter for an ABC network in Florida. She is a certified addiction counselor, having overcome an alcohol addiction of her own.

She has a younger brother, Pedro José Greer, who is a noted academic and physician.

References

External links
 
 

1955 births
Living people
American female tennis players
American sportspeople of Cuban descent
Tennis players from Miami
Miami Hurricanes women's tennis players
Cuban emigrants to the United States